Saint Sylvius of Toulouse (Silvius) was bishop of Toulouse from 360 AD to 400 AD.  He was succeeded by Saint Exuperius.  Sylvius began construction of the basilica of St. Sernin of Toulouse towards the end of the 4th century.  The church was later completed by his successor Exuperius.   Sylvius' remains were later transferred to the church he had begun.

References 

Bishops of Toulouse
Gallo-Roman saints
4th-century bishops in Gaul
History of Toulouse
4th-century Christian saints
Burials at the Basilica of St. Sernin